State Road 93 (NM 93) is a state highway in the US state of New Mexico. NM 93's southern terminus is a continuation of Curry County Road E at the Quay–Curry county line, and the northern terminus is at Interstate 40 (I-40) where it continues north as NM 392 north of Endee.

Major intersections

See also

References

093
Transportation in Quay County, New Mexico